The Cathedral is a 2021 American semi-autobiographical drama film written, directed, and edited by Ricky D'Ambrose. It stars Brian d'Arcy James and Monica Barbaro.

Premise
The film follows the life of Jesse Damrosch from his birth in 1987 until his college acceptance at the age of twenty. Familial drama like the AIDS-related death of his uncle Joseph, and his tense relationship for his father occurs against the backdrop of historical events like the 1993 bombing of the World Trade Center in New York City and the presidency of George W. Bush.

Cast
Brian d'Arcy James as Richard Damrosch
Monica Barbaro as Lydia Damrosch
Mark Zeisler as Nick Orkin
Geraldine Singer as Flora Orkin
Hudson McGuire as Jesse (age 3–5)
Henry Glendon Walter V as Jesse (age 9)
Robert Levey II as Jesse (age 12)
William Bednar-Carter as Jesse (age 16)

Production 
The film was selected for the Biennale College Cinema 2020-2021 program, which awarded it a €150,000 grant for production. It is a semi-autobiographical film based on the life of Ricky D'Ambrose, who wrote, directed and edited the film. David Lowery served as the film's executive producer.

Release 
The film had its international premiere at the 78th Venice International Film Festival. It premiered in the United States at the 2022 Sundance Film Festival. In December 2021, Visit Films purchased worldwide sales rights to the film, with Mubi acquiring the distribution rights for the United States and United Kingdom respectively.

Reception 
On Rotten Tomatoes, the film has an approval rating of 95% based on 20 reviews. The film received mostly positive reviews from critics, who praised its approach to storytelling and visuals. Writing for Deadline Hollywood, Todd McCarthy described the film as "eccentric" and praised filmmaking D'Ambrose's technique. In a review for Artforum, Amy Taubin characterized the film's use of sensory and visual guides to explore the memory of Jesse as "experimental." Richard Brody of The New Yorker favorably compared The Cathedral to the autobiographical films of Terence Davies.

Brian Tallerico, writing for RogerEbert.com, gave a more mixed review. He described the film as "clever" but said that some aspects of its performances and direction made it feel "disjointed" at times. Jordan Raup of The Film Stage gave the film a B, praising its handling of a coming of age story, while criticizing some performances as being "wooden".

Alissa Wilkinson of Vox described the film as "quietly stunning jewel box of a film", and included it on a list of the 18 best films at Sundance in 2022. It was also included on Thrillist's list of "The Best Movies at the 2022 Sundance Film Festival."

References

External links 

2021 films
2021 drama films
2021 independent films
2020s American films
2020s English-language films
American coming-of-age drama films
Films about dysfunctional families
Films set in New York (state)
Films set in the 1980s
Films set in the 1990s
Films set in the 2000s
HIV/AIDS in American films